Marstonia scalariformis, previously known as Pyrgulopsis scalariformis, common name the moss pyrg, is a species of freshwater snail with a gill and an operculum, aquatic gastropod mollusk in the family Hydrobiidae.

Shell description 
The shell is turreted, slender. The shell has 6 whorls. The shell is chalky white in color. The suture is deeply impressed. The shell is carinate in its entire length on the lower edge of the whorls.

The aperture is small, ovate, but slightly connected with the last whorl.

The height of the shell is 12.7 mm (½ inch).

Anatomy 
The body of the animal is white.

Distribution 
Distribution of Marstonia scalariformis include Illinois, Alabama, Iowa and Missouri.

This species was abundant on its type locality on the Tazewell shore of the Illinois River in 1880s.

Conservation 
This species is critically imperiled.

References
This article incorporates public domain text from reference.

External links 

Hydrobiidae